Pes anserinus ("goose's foot") refers to two anatomical structures:
 Pes anserinus (leg)
 Pes anserinus (facial nerve)

See also 
 Goose foot (disambiguation)